Blue Crush is a 2002 sports film directed by John Stockwell and based on Susan Orlean's 1998 Outside magazine article "Life's Swell". It stars Kate Bosworth, Michelle Rodriguez, Sanoe Lake and Mika Boorem. The film tells the story of three friends who have one passion: living the ultimate dream of surfing on Hawaii's famed North Shore.

Plot
Anne Marie (Kate Bosworth) and her fourteen-year-old sister, Penny (Mika Boorem), along with good friends Eden (Michelle Rodriguez) and Lena (Sanoe Lake), live in a small house on the North Shore. They all have been helping raise Penny, since her mother moved to Las Vegas with her boyfriend.

While Penny is at school, Anne Marie, Eden, and Lena work as maids in a super-luxury resort hotel, but more important than that, they are surfers. Anne Marie rises every morning before dawn to train for a possible surfing comeback. As a child, she had been a rising star in women's surfing, until she suffered a near-fatal wipeout. This has temporarily halted her progress; now when she is in really big powerful surf, she has deep-seated fears of dying. Her friends, especially Eden, are encouraging her to try once again to become a professional surfer.

Anne Marie is invited to join the surfing competition at the famed North Shore surf spot, the very challenging Banzai Pipeline. If she can do well enough to gain the attention of a sponsor, it would lift her and her friends out of the near-poverty in which they live. As the Pipeline competition gets closer, Anne Marie struggles to keep her young sister Penny from running wild and tries to deal with her own personal issues.

Anne Marie meets Matt Tollman (Matthew Davis), a National Football League quarterback who is in Hawaii for the Pro Bowl (it is hinted that he plays for the Minnesota Vikings). Matt is instantly attracted to the surfer. After a few encounters, Matt says he wants to learn to surf, and Anne Marie agrees to teach him, and several of his rowdy teammates, to surf for $150 per hour, with Lena, Eden and Penny acting as coaches. When Anne Marie goes to the hotel room to get the money, she sees Matt, but a call comes in. Anne Marie asks if it is Matt's wife, but he explains it is his niece. Later, they sleep together.

Anne Marie's acceptance of an outsider as her boyfriend causes friction between her and some of the young male surfers on the North Shore. Eden points out to Anne Marie that her current interest in Matt has weakened her commitment to training for the Pipeline contest. Anne Marie overhears very demeaning comments about herself from some of the other football players' wives and girlfriends, who are staying at the hotel.

Anne Marie confronts Matt about their situation. She soon resolves to step up her game, as she fully commits herself to the Pipeline Masters. On the day of Pipeline, Anne Marie wipes out during her first heat, but she advances to the next heat after narrowly beating pro surfer Kate Skarratt. She is shaken, but Matt tells her how he failed in his first game as an NFL quarterback, and this helps her get control of her wavering confidence.

Determined, although still apprehensive, Anne Marie returns to the water. Competing in the same heat is Keala Kennelly, one of the first professional female surfers. While Keala surfs the first few sets of waves well, Anne Marie is still reluctant to try one, visions of her near-drowning incident holding her back. Keala finishes her turn, then paddles back out to take Anne Marie under her wing. Keala encourages her to ride the best wave of the day, and Anne Marie rides it perfectly, managing to score a perfect ten. Although Anne Marie cannot advance to the next heat, she has regained her lost confidence and attracted the attention of sponsors, one of whom immediately offers to have her join the Billabong women's surf team.

Cast
 Kate Bosworth as Anne Marie Chadwick
 Coco Ho as Young Anne Marie
 Matthew Davis as Matt Tollman
 Michelle Rodriguez as Eden
 Sanoe Lake as Lena Olin
 Mika Boorem as Penny Chadwick
 Faizon Love as Leslie

Appearances from real-life surfers
 Keala Kennelly
 Carol Anne Philips
 Coco Ho
 Rochelle Ballard
 Layne Beachley
 Megan Abubo
 Brian Keaulana
 Tom Carroll
 Jamie O'Brien
 Bruce Irons
 Makua Rothman

Soundtrack

 "Cruel Summer (Blestenation Mix)" (5:13) – Blestenation
 "Big Love" (3:48) – Chicken Josh Debear (rap/vocals)
 "Daybreaker" (3:54) – Beth Orton
 "Everybody Got Their Something" (4:22) – Nikka Costa
 "Front To Back (Fatboy Slim Remix)" (3:53) – Playgroup
 "And Be Loved" (3:02) – Damian Marley
 "Destiny" (5:40) – Zero 7
 "Firesuite" (4:37) – Doves

Reception

Critical response
Rotten Tomatoes rated 62% of reviews from 144 critics as positive, with an average rating of 5.80/10. The site's consensus reads, "The surfing sequences are exhilarating, but the plot is pretty forgettable and trite." Metacritic gave the movie a score of 61 based on 33 reviews, indicating "generally favorable reviews". On their weekly film recap show, Roger Ebert and Richard Roeper gave the film 3/4 stars.

Box office
The film opened on 3,002 screens in the United States on August 18, 2002. It grossed $14.2 million and placed third on the weekend. It went on to gross $40.4 million in the United States, and a total of $51.8 million worldwide. The film's estimated budget was $25 million. Blue Crush was the first film to use Hawaii's Act 221, a progressive local tax incentive that called for a 100 percent state tax credit for high-tech investments meeting the requirements for qualified high-tech business, while also allowing local investors to receive tax credits for investments in film or television productions. Universal Studios used the legislation for the Blue Crush production, receiving approximately $16 million in a deal with local investors who, in exchange, received the film's high-tech tax credits. The agreement also involved marketing rights for the Hawaii Visitors and Convention Bureau whereby the studio would cross-promote the film and the State of Hawaii.  Entertainment executive April Masini, who helped produce Baywatch: Hawaii, Pacific Blue, and the Miss Universe Pageant, brought the tax incentives to the attention of Universal Studios, and along with producer Adam Fields advised the state in its negotiation.

Television
In October 2017, NBC was developing a television adaptation of the film.

See also
 Blue Crush 2, the unrelated direct-to-video sequel
 Ride the Wild Surf, a 1964 film about three men visiting Hawaii to surf

References

External links
 
 
 
 
 
 
 

2002 films
2000s female buddy films
2002 romantic drama films
2000s sports drama films
2000s teen drama films
American coming-of-age drama films
American female buddy films
American romantic drama films
American sports drama films
American teen drama films
2000s English-language films
Films about women's sports
Films based on newspaper and magazine articles
Films directed by John Stockwell
Films produced by Brian Grazer
Films scored by Paul Haslinger
Films set in Hawaii
Films set on beaches
Imagine Entertainment films
American surfing films
Universal Pictures films
2000s American films